Thomas Ashall (16 October 1915 – 1976) was an English professional footballer who played in the Football League for Mansfield Town.

References

1915 births
1976 deaths
English footballers
Association football forwards
English Football League players
Mansfield Town F.C. players
Nuneaton Borough F.C. players